So You Won't Talk may refer to:

 So You Won't Talk (1935 film), a British comedy film
 So You Won't Talk (1940 film), an American comedy crime film